Morris Island may refer to the following:

North America
Morris Island is an island in the U.S. state of Massachusetts
Morris Island is a privately owned island located in Battle Creek, Michigan
Morris Island is an island in the Canadian province of Nova Scotia
Morris Island is an island in the U.S. state of Virginia
Morris Island is an uninhabited island within Charleston Harbor in the U.S. state of South Carolina
Morris Island Conservation Area is on the Ottawa River near Ottawa, Ontario, Canada

Australia
Morris Island is a small island in the Great Barrier Reef, Queensland Australia

Antarctica
Morris Island is an island in Antarctica